The 2000–01 season was Birmingham City Football Clubs 98th season in the English football league system. It ran from 1 July 2000 to 30 June 2001.

Led by manager Trevor Francis, the team repeated the previous season's fifth-place finish in the Football League First Division to qualify for the play-offs for a second consecutive season, but suffered another semi-final defeat, this time to Preston North End, losing 4–2 on penalties after drawing 2–2 over two legs. They were eliminated in the third round of the FA Cup, and reached the Football League Cup final for the first time since 1963, facing Liverpool. Liverpool took the lead in the 30th minute through Robbie Fowler, but Birmingham equalised in the last minute of normal time with a Darren Purse penalty. No further goals were scored in extra time, so the match was settled in a penalty shoot-out; Martin Grainger's and Andrew Johnson's penalties were saved, and Liverpool won 5–4 on penalties.

The top scorer for the season was Geoff Horsfield, with twelve goals in all competitions, of which seven were in the League; Marcelo also scored seven league goals.

Kit
French apparel manufacturers Le Coq Sportif remained Birmingham's kit suppliers for the third season in a row, and introduced a new kit for the season. Auto Windscreens remained the kit sponsors, also for the third consecutive season.

Football League First Division

Match details
General sources: Match content not verifiable from these sources is referenced individually.

League table (part)

Results summary

Play-offs

FA Cup

League Cup

General sources: Match content not verifiable from these sources is referenced individually.

Final

Transfers

In

 Brackets round club names indicate the player's contract with that club had expired before he joined Birmingham.

Out

 Brackets round a club denote the player joined that club after his Birmingham City contract expired.

Loan in

Loan out

Appearances and goals
Source:

Numbers in parentheses denote appearances as substitute.
Players with squad numbers struck through and marked  left the club during the playing season.

References
General
 

Specific

Birmingham City F.C. seasons
Birmingham City F.C.